Richard Sullivan may refer to:

 Richard J. Sullivan (born 1964), judge of the United States Court of Appeals for the Second Circuit
 Richard T. Sullivan (died 1981), novelist
 Sir Richard Sullivan, 1st Baronet (1752–1806), British Member of Parliament and writer
 Sir Richard Benjamin Magniac Sullivan, 8th Baronet (1906–1977) of the Sullivan baronets
 Sir Richard Arthur Sullivan, 9th Baronet (born 1931) of the Sullivan baronets
 Rick Sullivan (Richard K. Sullivan, Jr., born 1959), American politician in Massachusetts
 Rip Sullivan (Richard Sullivan, born 1959), American community activist in Virginia

See also
 Richie Sullivan, a co-writer of the song Offshore '97
 Dick Sullivan, British actor of Seekers
 Richard O'Sullivan (disambiguation)
 Frederic Richard Sullivan (1872–1937), English-born film director and actor